Fairview is a ghost town in Churchill County, Nevada, in the United States of America.

History
Discovery of silver in the area in 1905 led to several claims and the creation of a boom town in 1906.  Some of the first mining claims were bought by George Nixon and George Wingfield, which helped drive the boom. The community took its name from Fairview Peak.  Fairview changed locations twice, once to move closer to the mines and mills in which the town's residents worked, and once because the town outgrew the narrow canyon in which the second town was sited. 

From 1906 to 1907, the mining camp's population expanded dramatically. Fairview had multiple hotels, banks, assay offices, 27 saloons, a newspaper, post office, a union hall and a population of 2000.  After 1908, outside interest in the mining camps and town declined, and the newspaper closed. The town stayed prosperous until 1912, and afterwards was abandoned.

Fairview had a post office from April 1906 through May 1919. 
Fairview appears on maps as a stop or station for the Pony Express.  The location of the station  is about 5.7 mile north of the site of Fairview.

Fairview is currently a ghost town. One of the few remnants of the old town is the bank vault from the first town site's bank; the vault can be seen from the nearby Austin-Lincoln Highway.

1954 earthquakes
A very large earthquake doublet occurred on December 16, 1954. The  Dixie Valley/Fairview earthquakes occurred four minutes apart, each with a maximum Mercalli intensity of X (Extreme). The initial shock measured 7.3  and the second shock measured 6.9 . Damage to man-made structures was minimal because the region was sparsely populated at the time, but oblique-slip motion on a normal fault resulted in the appearance of large fault scarps.

Gallery

References

External links 
 Fairview - text and photos. (forgottennevada.com)

Further reading 
 

Pony Express stationsA
Ghost towns in Churchill County, Nevada
Ghost towns in Nevada